Caston Junior-Senior High School is a middle school and high school located in Fulton, Indiana. It is part of Caston School Corp which also includes Caston Elementary School. The two share a single campus and main building.

See also
 List of high schools in Indiana

References

External links
 Official Website

Public high schools in Indiana
Schools in Fulton County, Indiana